Tiris Zemmour is the northernmost region of Mauritania. Its capital is Zouérat. Other major cities/towns include F'dérik and Bir Moghrein. The region borders Algeria to the north-east, Mali to east, the Mauritanian region of Adrar to the south and Western Sahara to west and north-west.

As of 2013, the population of the region was 53,261, compared to 49,842 in 2011. As of 2008, the activity rate was 50.80 and economic dependency ratio was 0.71. As of 2008, the literacy rate for people aged 15 years and over was 81.00.

Demographics
As of 2013, the population of the region was 53,261, compared to 49,842 in 2011. 55.61% of the population were females and 44.39% were males. As of 2008, the rate of households confirming the existence of public telephone in their neighbourhood or village was 96.75, the rate of households benefiting from electricity in their neighbourhood was 4.06%, the rate of households benefiting from health center or health post in their neighbourhood was 1.72%, and rate of households benefiting from sanitary services was 0.51%.

Economy
As of 2008, the activity rate was 50.80 and economic dependency ratio was 0.71. The fraction of people working in government was 23.10%, individual / household private was 5.80%, other was 33.60%, para public was 20.20%, and private enterprise was 17.30%. The Grand Total as of 2008 was 943.01. As of 2013, the coverage rate of DPT3 Children From 0 to 11 Months in the region was 74.80%, BGC vaccination was 78.20 and polio vaccination coverage was 74.50. As of 2007, the number of tourist establishments in the region was 4. As of 2008, the literacy rate for people aged 15 years and over was 81.00. The net enrolment ratio of girls for secondary level was 36.90%, net enrolment ratio of boys for secondary level was 23.30%, and total net enrolment ratio at secondary level was 30.20%.

Geography
Mauritania is mostly covered with desert, with only its western regions around the coast of Atlantic Ocean having some vegetation. There are some oasis in the desert regions. Since it is a desert, there are large shifting dunes forming temporary ranges. Due to the geography, the inhabitants historically, have been nomadic. In modern times, people have migrated to urban centres during the drought in 1970 and 1980. There are a few sedentary cultivators, who are located only in the Southern regions of the country.

Administration

Tiris Zemmour is divided into three departments, namely, Bir Moghrein, F'Derik and Zouérat. The local administration is adopted from French local administration framework with a Ministry of Internal Control governing the local bodies. The original administration was held by Governors of each district, but after the municipal elections in 1994, the powers has been decentralized from the district bodies. Mauritania has been divided into 13 wilayas (regions), including the Nouakchott Capital District. The smallest administrative division in the country is the commune and the country has 216 of them. A group of communes form a moughataa (department) and the group of moughataa form a district. There are total of 53 moughataa for the 13 districts in the country. The executive power of the district is vested on a district chief,  while it is on hakem for moughataa.  Out of the 216 communes, 53 classified as urban and rest 163 are rural. The communes are responsible for overseeing and coordinating development activities and are financed by the state. The Local Governments have their own legal jurisdiction, financial autonomy, an annual budget, staff, and an office. The elections for the local government are conducted every five years along with Senate and Parliamentary elections. On account of the political instability, the last elections were held in 2006.

See also
Departments of Mauritania
Geography of Mauritania
Regions of Mauritania

References

 
Regions of Mauritania